Barbara Avedon (June 14, 1925 – August 31, 1994) was an American television writer, political activist, and feminist. She founded the anti-war organization Another Mother for Peace.

Biography
She was one of the writers for the television series Bewitched, and helped a group of Jefferson High School students write the episode "Sisters at Heart". She also wrote for Executive Suite and Fish, a 1977-78 spin-off from Barney Miller. With Barbara Corday, Avedon created Cagney & Lacey, the world's first dramatic television series to place women in both of its starring roles. They came up with the idea for this television series after having read Molly Haskell's book From Reverence to Rape which stated that there had never been a female buddy film. Avedon and Corday initially intended Cagney & Lacey to be a film. While they were writing the series together, Avedon was more experienced and proficient in screenwriting than Corday, and Avedon mentored Corday in this area throughout the series. They were best friends for nearly a decade.

Personal life
Avedon married twice. Her first husband was Phil Sharp; they remained married until his death. Her second husband was Mel Avedon; they had one child before the marriage was dissolved. Her son Joshua is a co-founder of Jumpstart, a not-for-profit that focuses on transforming the broader Jewish community through spirituality, learning, social activism, and culture, and the Jewish congregation IKAR.

References

1925 births
1994 deaths
American television writers
American women television writers
American feminist writers
20th-century American women writers
American women screenwriters
20th-century American screenwriters
Screenwriters from New York (state)
Writers from New York City